The Carolina Renaissance Festival is a 25 acre renaissance themed amusement park and one of the largest Renaissance fairs in America.  The Festival is set in a fictional storybook village of "Fairhaven" and nestled within 325 acres of autumn woodlands. The open air village and artisan marketplace contains cottages and bungalows of 16th century European architecture.  Inside the village gates are over 140 merchants, crafters, and artisans. Sixteen outdoor stages are used for theater, comedy, music, dance, magic, circus entertainments, swimming mermaids, and live falconry demonstrations.  Hundreds of costumed villagers and fantasy characters roam the lanes offering additional interactive entertainment.  The Festival's premier attractions feature knights on horseback jousting three times daily inside the Queen's tournament arena, Falconry presentations, and Swimming Mermaids. The Festival is held annually on Saturdays and Sundays in October and November and three consecutive week dates in October as a field trip destination for area schools.  The Festival is located just north of Charlotte, North Carolina between the towns of Huntersville and Concord near the intersection of 73 and Poplar Tent Road and with equal distance access to I-77 and I-85.  An  average of 195,000 visitors time travel to the Festival during its fall season.

Attractions

Stage shows feature live music, dance, comedy shows, and performers with circus variety skills such as juggling, aerial silks, acrobatics, and sideshow antics.  Musicians perform with traditional instruments such as the harp, bagpipes, or other, more obscure, "period" instruments. Roaming the "lanes" of the festival are a variety of nationally traveling professional street performers who engage visitors to help create an interactive performance experience. In addition to 16 stages of non-stop entertainments, there are three premier attractions:

1) Jousting Knights on Horseback:  Thrice daily stunt riders on horseback charge at each other with lances in full tilt. The jousts are performed by Aventail Productions and the competition is scored with historically accuracy with points and victory awarded to the true winners of each competition.  The last joust of the day ends with a conflict settled by a ground fight to the "death". 

2) The Ancient Art of Falconry is presented four times daily at the Edgewood Theatre.  Watch as a variety of birds-of-prey display the unique skills that enraptured nobles long ago and made falconry the sport of kings.  Children and adults alike are amazed by these beautiful creatures in flight.

3) The "Sea Fairies" Mermaid exhibit feature mermaid models swimming in a 3,000 gallon aquarium tank. Accompanying the tank is always a Mermaid sitting on a throne taking photos with children.

The Carolina Renaissance Festival also operates an in-house performance company featuring over 100 costumed characters who also interact directly with visitors at the fair, in an attempt to create a more authentic feel of a renaissance-era town and to help bring the "village" to life. Individuals in the company develop characters such as "The Village Baker," "Tavern Keeper," etc.  The Village Lord Mayor, and the fictional Royal Family that has come to visit the shire are other examples. The company is primarily composed of people from surrounding communities, including Concord, Greensboro, Raleigh and Charlotte.  Auditions are held June of each year.

Activities

Over 140 vendors sell a variety of handmade arts and craft goods such as handmade jewelry, artisan leather goods, blown glass made at live demonstrations, candles, and custom chain mail. The festival vends an assortment of medieval themed foods, including giant turkey legs, various soups, stews, and chowders served in "bread bowls", "Steak on a Stake", fish and chips, corn on the cob, and Scotch eggs.

Alongside the shops one can find games such as archery target-shooting, crossbow shooting, axe throwing, frog catapults and a gold coin hunt.

Weddings and vow renewal ceremonies are also held on site, with ceremonies attended by the cast of the Royal Court and a covered pavilion reserved for the couple.

In addition to the above, the festival has several mini-themed weekends throughout the course of the season such as the popular "Time Travelers Weekend" where costume players of all genres (science fiction, comic books, etc.) are invited to time travel to the renaissance. Other themes include BrewFest Weekend, Halloween Daze & Spooky Knights Weekend, and Pirate's Christmas Weekend. Opening Weekend is always celebrated with a buy one, get one free discount for adult admission (coupon required).

History
The Carolina Renaissance Festival was introduced in 1994 by Jeff Siegel, owner of parent company Royal Faires that also owns and operates the Arizona Renaissance Festival.

The festival did not take place in 2020 due to the COVID-19 pandemic.

See also
 List of Renaissance and Medieval fairs
 Reenactment
 List of open-air and living history museums in the United States

References

External links
 
 Official Facebook Page
 http://www.charlottenow.com/carolina_renaissance_festival_1008_through_1120-ev-27/
 https://web.archive.org/web/20111008094557/http://www.elevatelifestyle.com/magazine/v/18th-annual-carolina-renaissance-festival-elevate/

Festivals in North Carolina
Tourist attractions in Mecklenburg County, North Carolina
Renaissance fairs
Cultural festivals in the United States
Festivals established in 1994
1994 establishments in North Carolina